Hadan (also Romanized as Hādān and Hadān; also known as Ardūn, Hādūn, and Hāvān) is a village in Sardshir Rural District, in the Central District of Buin va Miandasht County, Isfahan Province, Iran. At the 2006 census, its population was 498, in 115 families.

Hadan is a part of larger region known as Fereydan (Persian: فریدن, Armenian: Փերիա). Up until the 1990's, the village was historically populated by Armenians who were brought to this part of Iran by Shah Abbas of Safavid dynasty in 1603 and 1604, following the Nakhchivan deportations. After the revolution in 1979, many Armenians began emigrating out of Hadan. As of 2022, only a single Armenian remains in the village on a visiting basis.

References 

Populated places in Buin va Miandasht County